Joseph Mazzulla (born June 30, 1988) is an American professional basketball coach who is the head coach for the Boston Celtics of the National Basketball Association (NBA). He played college basketball for West Virginia University.

High school career

Mazzulla attended Bishop Hendricken High School in Rhode Island, where he made the all-state first team. He won three state titles at Bishop Hendricken, with his third as a senior on a last-second shot.

College career
As a freshman at West Virginia, Mazzulla helped the team win the 2007 National Invitation Tournament under coach John Beilein. In the 2008 NCAA Tournament, Mazzulla posted 13 points, 11 rebounds and 8 assists in a second-round upset of Duke. He was forced to redshirt the 2008–09 season due to a shoulder injury against Ole Miss, as his growth plate never fused with his shoulder. He was unsure if he would ever play again, but practiced for two hours a day and underwent risky surgery. In April 2009, he was arrested for domestic battery at a bar in Morgantown, West Virginia and was suspended by coach Bob Huggins. As a redshirt junior, Mazzulla was named a captain and helped West Virginia reach the 2010 Final Four. He scored 17 points in the Elite Eight upset of Kentucky. As a senior, he averaged 7.7 points and 3.8 rebounds per game. In his career, he scored 700 points and dished out 340 assists.

Coaching career

College coaching career
Shortly after graduating college, Mazzulla was offered a coaching job at Nova Southeastern. He turned it down to pursue professional opportunities. He did not find any suitable opportunities overseas, and in September 2011 he joined Glenville State as an assistant. Mazzulla was hired as an assistant at Fairmont State under Jerrod Calhoun in 2013. During the 2016–17 season, he served as an assistant for the Maine Red Claws of the NBA G League. Mazzulla was named head coach of Fairmont State in March 2017. In his second season, he led the team to a 22–9 record and appearance in the 2019 NCAA Division II Tournament, where they lost in the first round to Mercyhurst, 63–60, in overtime.

Boston Celtics
In June 2019, he was hired as an assistant coach of the Boston Celtics. Mazzulla was named interim head coach for the Celtics after Ime Udoka was suspended for the entire 2022–23 season on September 22, 2022. On December 1, 2022, he was named Eastern Conference Coach of the Month for October and November, following the Celtics beginning their season with a league-best 18–4 record. On January 30, 2023, Mazzulla was named the head coach for Team Giannis for the 2023 NBA All-Star Game. On February 16, the Celtics officially named Mazzulla head coach and signed him to a contract extension.

Personal life
Mazzulla was born in Johnston, Rhode Island. He is the son of basketball coach Dan Mazzulla, who played college basketball at Bryant and professionally for five years in Chile. In 2007, Dan Mazzulla was inducted into the Bryant Hall of Fame. He died of cancer in April 2020. Joe's younger brother, Justin, played basketball at George Washington University before transferring to the University of Vermont. Joe and his wife have two children. He is a devout Catholic.

Head coaching record

College

References

External links
 College stats at Sports-Reference.com

1988 births
Living people
African-American Catholics
Basketball coaches from Rhode Island
Basketball players from Rhode Island
Bishop Hendricken High School alumni
Boston Celtics assistant coaches
Fairmont State Fighting Falcons men's basketball coaches
Glenville State Pioneers basketball coaches
Maine Red Claws coaches
People from Johnston, Rhode Island
Sportspeople from Providence County, Rhode Island
West Virginia Mountaineers men's basketball players